Gois, De Góis or Degois can refer to:
 Bento de Góis (1562-1607), Portuguese traveller, probably the first European to travel overland from India to China via Afghanistan
 Damião de Góis, 16th-century Portuguese philosopher
 Typhanie Degois (born 1992), French politician
 The Passage du Gois, a natural, periodically flooded passage leading to the island of Noirmoutier in France
 Góis, a town and municipality in Portugal
 Gois (moth), a genus of moths in the family Megalopygidae

See also
Goes (disambiguation)